Antonio Bacchetti (7 March 1923 in Codroipo – 1979 in Udine) was an Italian footballer.

External links

1923 births
1979 deaths
Italian footballers
Serie A players
Atalanta B.C. players
S.S.D. Lucchese 1905 players
Inter Milan players
Brescia Calcio players
S.S.C. Napoli players
Torino F.C. players
F.C. Crotone players
Association football midfielders